Alexandra Alexeyevna Avstriyskaya (born 30 October 2000 in Moscow) is a Russian figure skater. She is the 2016 CS Warsaw Cup bronze medalist in ladies' singles.

Personal life 
Alexandra's mother is Marina Avstriyskaya, a Soviet figure skater who competed in pairs skating.

Results 
CS: Challenger Series

References

External links 
 Results at ISU
 Profile  at CSKA
 Alexandra Avstriyskaya at Fskate.ru

2000 births
Figure skaters from Moscow
Russian female single skaters
Living people